Gerald H. Haug (born 14 April 1968 in Karlsruhe, Germany) is a German geologic climatologist, prize winner of the Gottfried Wilhelm Leibniz Prize and since 2007 he has a professorship at the ETH Zürich in Switzerland. In 2015 he became director of the Climate Geochemistry Department and Scientific Member at the Max Planck Institute for Chemistry in Mainz  and since March 2020, he became the new President of the National Academy of Sciences Leopoldina.

Early life and education
Haug graduated in Geology at the University of Karlsruhe in 1992 and received his PhD at the University of Kiel, Germany, in 1995.

Career
From 1995 to 1996 Haug worked as a postdoc at GEOMAR, Helmholtz Center for Ocean Research Kiel, Germany. From 1996 to 1997 he had been a postdoctoral fellow in the Department of Oceanography at the University of British Columbia, Vancouver, Canada. Subsequently, he worked as a postdoctoral student at the Woods Hole Oceanographic Institution in Massachusetts, United States, and became later a research assistant professor at the University of Southern California, Los Angeles, United States (1997–1998). From 2000 to 2002, he worked as a senior assistant at the ETH Zürich, Switzerland, and habilitated in the Earth Sciences (2002).

Haug is signee of a protest note which points out the dangers arising from ignoring climate change.

Haug initiated the construction of the research sail yacht S/Y Eugen Seibold and coordinates the research.

Other activities
 German Future Prize, Member of the Board of Trustees (since 2020)
 Academy of Sciences and Literature, Member (since 2018)
 Academia Europaea, Member (since 2008)
 Alfred Wegener Institute for Polar and Marine Research, Member of the Board of Governors
 Karlsruhe Institute of Technology (KIT), Member of the Supervisory Board
 Max Planck Institute of Microstructure Physics, Member of the Board of Trustees 
 Max Planck Institute for Polymer Research, Member of the Board of Trustees
 Potsdam Institute for Climate Impact Research (PIK), Chair of the Scientific Advisory Board
 Werner Siemens Foundation, Member of the Advisory Council

Awards and honors 
 2001:  of the Deutsche Forschungsgemeinschaft (DFG)
 2007: Gottfried Wilhelm Leibniz Prize of the DFG
 2010: Rössler Prize

Selected publications 
 
 
 
 
 with Daniel M. Sigman: The biological pump in the past. In: Henry Elderfield (Hrsg.): Treatise on Geochemistry. Volume 6: The Oceans and Marine Geochemistry. Elsevier, 2003,  (PDF)

References 

1968 births
Living people
German climatologists
21st-century German geologists
Presidents of the German Academy of Sciences Leopoldina
Academic staff of ETH Zurich
Max Planck Institute directors